Ghosts of Loss is the second studio album by Swallow the Sun, released on August 24, 2005. Compared with their debut, this album has more influences of gothic metal. Some of its themes are greatly influenced by the 1990-91 TV serial Twin Peaks.

Track listing
All songs written by Juha Raivio.

Personnel
Mikko Kotamäki - vocals 
Markus Jämsen - guitar 
Juha Raivio - guitar 
Aleksi Munter - keyboards 
Matti Honkonen - bass guitar 
Pasi Pasanen - drums

Production 
 Recorded, engineered & mixed by Sami Kokko.
 Mastered by Minerva Pappi.

Chart positions

Cultural references 
The album contains multiple references to the TV series Twin Peaks. Laura Palmer is the girl around whose murder the series revolves. Guitarist Juha Raivio said in an interview, "The song got nothing to do with real Laura Palmer or Twin Peaks, but the feeling is there and everybody knows what kind of girl Laura really was. So, no love song here." The Giant is a character from the second season.

References 

Swallow the Sun albums
2005 albums